Ludovico Gargiulo (born 23 March 1995) is an Italian football player. He plays for Scandicci.

Club career
He made his Serie C debut for Tuttocuoio on 30 August 2014 in a game against Carrarese.

References

External links
 

1995 births
Sportspeople from the Province of Salerno
Living people
Italian footballers
A.C. Tuttocuoio 1957 San Miniato players
U.S. Cremonese players
A.C. Prato players
Serie C players
Association football midfielders
Footballers from Campania